Tanaga is an indigenous type of Filipino poem. Tanaga may also refer to
Tanaga (volcano), in the Aleutian Islands, Alaska
Tanaga Island, part of the Aleutian Islands, Alaska
Tanaga Pass, a strait between Tanaga Island and the Delarof Islands 
Little Tanaga Island, in the Aleutian Islands, Alaska